The West Branch Pocwock Stream is a tributary of the Pocwock River flowing in:
 Quebec (Canada): in the administrative area of Bas-Saint-Laurent, in Kamouraska Regional County Municipality, in unorganized territory of Picard, Quebec. Note: In Quebec, the river is designated "ruisseau Pocwock";
 Maine (United States): in North Maine Woods, in the Aroostook County, in townships T18 R13 Wels, T17 R14 Wels and T17 R13 Wels.

Its runs entirely in forested area in isolated mountain valley, mainly in the Maine, at the Southeast of the Canada-US border. Its higher course is located at Northeast of Eastern Lake (Kamouraska).

"West Branch Pocwock Stream" empties on Northeast shore of Pocwock River which flows toward Southeast, up to a river elbow of Saint John River (Bay of Fundy). The later serpentine Eastward, than South-East crossing all the province of New Brunswick and empties on North Shore of Bay of Fundy which is opened to South West to Atlantic Ocean.

The watershed of Pocwock stream is accessible by some forest roads.

Geography 

The upper portion of the "Pocwock brook" (French: ruisseau Pocwock) begins in Notre Dame Mountains, in the unorganized territory of Picard, Quebec, in Kamouraska Regional County Municipality, in Quebec. This source is located:
  Northwest of the border between Quebec and Maine;
  Northeast of Eastern Lake (Kamouraska);
  Northwest from the confluence of the "West Branch Pocwock Stream";
  Southeast of coast of Saint Lawrence River, in Quebec.

From the source in the mountains, the "West Branch Pocwock Stream"  as follows:

  to the Southeast in unorganized territory of Picard, up to the border entre Quebec and Maine.

  to the South, through a small forest plain, up to the confluence of the river.

The "West Branch Pocwock Stream" empties on the Northeast shore of Pocwock River, in township T17 R14 Wels, in the Aroostook County. This confluence Is located:
  Southeast of the border Canada-US;
  Northwest of the confluence of the Chimenticook River;
  downstream of the confluence of the Pocwock River.

Toponymy
The term "Pocwock" is associated to "Pocwock River", "East Branch Pocwock Stream". In Québec, the spelling of the river's name uses the letter k in the middle or "Pockwock"; the spelling "Pocwock" (without the letter k in the middle) is used by the GNIS (Geographic Names Information System) in the US.

The place name "West Branch Creek Pockwock" was formalized on August 7, 1978 at the Commission de toponymie du Québec (Quebec Geographical Names Board).

See also 

 Kamouraska Regional County Municipality (RCM)
 Aroostook County, a county of Maine
 Pocwock River, a stream
 Saint John River (Bay of Fundy), a stream
 North Maine Woods, a geographical region of Maine
 List of rivers of Quebec
 List of rivers of Maine

References

Bibliography

External links 
  Maine Streamflow données de l'USGS
  Maine Watershed données à partir de l'Environmental Protection Agency
 

Tributaries of the Saint John River (Bay of Fundy)
Rivers of Aroostook County, Maine
North Maine Woods